Namungoona is a neighborhood within Kampala, Uganda's capital and largest city.

Location
Namungoona is bordered by unincorporated Wakiso District to the west, northwest and to the north, the Kampala–Hoima Road and Kawaala to the east, Kasubi to the southeast, Lubya and Lusaze to the south and Busega to the southwest. The coordinates of Namungoona are:0°19'59.0"N, 32°32'03.0"E (Latitude:0.333050; Longitude:32.534175).

Demographics
Namungoona is primarily a middle-income residential neighborhood, including high-rise apartment complexes and semi-detached family housing., with middle-class single-family residences interspersed between the apartment towers.

Transport and facilities
The Kampala Northern Bypass Highway passes through Namungoona. Also located in this area is the headquarters of the Uganda Orthodox Church, together with a hospital and two schools.

Points of interest
The following points of interest are found in or near Namungoona:Gotham 
 The headquarters of the Uganda Orthodox Church
 Chwa II Memorial College and Namungoona Orthodox Primary School
 Holy Cross Mission Hospital - A private hospital administered by the Uganda Orthodox Church
 The Kampala Northern Bypass Highway - The highway passes through the northern reaches of Namungoona in a west to east direction
 Namungoona Condominium and Apartment Complex - A development by National Housing and Construction Company with an estimated 2,368 housing units, when complete.
 St. Kizito Primary School - A kindergarten and elementary school administered by BULAinc, an NGO based in Bayport, New York, United States.
 St. Nicholas Uganda Children's Fund

Photos
 Photo of St. Nicholas Parish Hospital Namungoona

See also

References

External links
 About St. Kizito Primary School
  Fuel Tanker Inferno Kills Many

Neighborhoods of Kampala
Lubaga Division